Oronoque is an unincorporated community in Norton County, Kansas, United States.

History
Virgil Vogel, in Indian Names in Michigan refers to Oronoque as a variant spelling of Orinoco, the name of a South American river that was adopted with various spellings in other states: Oronoko Charter Township, Michigan and Oronoco, Minnesota.

Oronoque had a post office from 1885 until 1934.

Lucas Maddy, a native of Norton County, and the Kansas Cartel named their 2015 album Oronoque in honor of the former community.

Education
The community is served by Norton USD 211 public school district.

References

Further reading

External links
 Historical details from rootsweb.com
 Photograph of schoolhouse in Oronoque
 Norton County maps: Current, Historic, KDOT

Unincorporated communities in Norton County, Kansas
Unincorporated communities in Kansas